SS Asiatic (sometimes operated as the RMS Asiatic) was a steamship operated by the White Star Line from 1871 to 1873, a sister ship to . Sold off after only two years, she was renamed SS Ambriz, and eventually was wrecked in 1903.

Ship history
Asiatic was built as a passenger-cargo ship during the transition from sail to steam power, so she was fitted with three fully rigged masts in addition to her two-cylinder compound steam engine manufactured by Laird Brothers of Birkenhead, England. In addition to cargo, she could carry up to 10 passengers. She was launched by Thomas Royden & Sons of Liverpool on 1 December 1870, and the White Star Line bought her in early 1871. She operated first in the Calcutta, India, trade, but transferred to the South American route in 1872. From February 1873, she sailed to South America for the White Star Line.

Renamed Ambriz, she operated on the West African route from September 1873. In November or December 1875, she rescued the crew of the British barque Eagle, which foundered in the Atlantic Ocean. In December 1883, she was refitted and re-engined, and from 1894 she served on the Liverpool–New Orleans cotton route. Ambriz was sold in 1896 to the Cie Française de Charbonnage et de la Batelage ("French Coaling & Shipping Company"), for which she served as a coal depot ship, regularly sailing from her base at Madagascar to Europe to replenish her coal supply. She was wrecked off the coast of Madagascar in February 1903.

References

External links
 

1870 ships
Ships built on the River Mersey
Ships of the White Star Line
Steamships of France
Steamships of the United Kingdom
Merchant ships of France
Merchant ships of the United Kingdom
Maritime incidents in 1903
Shipwrecks in the Indian Ocean
Ships of the Lamport and Holt Line